Natalia Dubrovinskaia (born 18 February 1961) is a Swedish geologist of Russian origin.

Education 
Dubrovinskaia earned a Master of Science degree in geochemistry and a PhD in crystallography and crystal physics from Moscow State University.

Career 
Dubrovinskaia was a research fellow at the Ministry of Geology and a post-doctoral researcher at Uppsala University.

In 2005, Dubrovinskaia led a team of researchers from the University of Bayreuth who were reported to have produced aggregated diamond nanorods from fullerene under high temperatures and pressures. Two years earlier, large samples of nanodiamond were produced in a cheaper way (from graphite) and discovered to be harder than diamond by Japanese researchers. Dubrovinskaia works at the Heidelberg University in Germany as a Privatdozent and senior scientist.

Personal life
Dubrovinskaia is married to Leonid Dubrovinsky, a geoscientist at University of Bayreuth.

References

Living people
1961 births
21st-century Swedish geologists
Swedish people of Russian descent
Swedish women geologists